Erythrolamprus frenatus, the swamp liophis, is a species of snake in the family Colubridae. The species is found in Brazil, Paraguay, and Argentina.

References

Erythrolamprus
Reptiles of Brazil
Reptiles of Paraguay
Reptiles of Argentina
Reptiles described in 1909
Taxa named by Franz Werner